Nagalingam is a Tamil male given name. Due to the Tamil tradition of using patronymic surnames it may also be a surname for males and females.

Notable people

Given name
 Nagalingam, Indian film director
 C. Nagalingam (1893–1958), Ceylonese judge and lawyer
 P. Nagalingam, Indian politician
 Ponnambalam Nagalingam, Ceylonese politician

Surname
 Nagalingam Ethirveerasingam, Ceylonese athlete
 Nagalingam Shanmugalingam, Sri Lankan sociologist and academic
 Nagalingam Shanmugathasan (1920–1993), Sri Lankan trade unionist and politician

See also
 
 

Tamil masculine given names